I Thought About You is a 1987 live album by Shirley Horn, her first album for Verve Records.

Reception

In the opinion of Allmusic reviewer Scott Yanow: "This live set...was Shirley Horn's 'comeback' album after many years in which she purposely maintained a low profile as she raised her daughter. Typical of Horn's music ever since, she sings intimate ballads with her trio...and plays very effective piano behind her vocals".

Track listing
 "Something Happens to Me" (Marvin Fisher, Jack Segal) - 3:41
 "The Eagle and Me" (Harold Arlen, E. Y. Harburg) - 3:10
 "I Got It Bad (and That Ain't Good)" (Duke Ellington, Paul Francis Webster) - 4:58
 "Love Is Here to Stay" (George Gershwin, Ira Gershwin) - 3:33
 "Isn't It Romantic?" (Richard Rodgers, Lorenz Hart) - 6:02
 "Estate (Summer)" (Bruno Brighetti, Bruno Martino, Joel E. Siegel) - 7:42
 "Nice 'n' Easy" (Lew Spence, Alan Bergman, Marilyn Bergman) - 4:54
 "I Thought About You" (Jimmy Van Heusen, Johnny Mercer) - 5:59
 "The Great City" (Curtis Reginald Lewis) - 2:52
 "I Wish I Didn't Love You So" (Frank Loesser) - 5:26  
 "Corcovado (Quiet Nights of Quiet Stars)" (Antonio Carlos Jobim, Gene Lees) - 11:56

Personnel
Performance
Shirley Horn – piano, vocals
Charles Ables – bass guitar
Steve Williams – drums
Production
Ellie Hughes – art direction, design
Tom Hughes
Nick Dofflemeyer – assistant engineer
Richard Seidel – consultant
Larry Walsh – editing
David Kreisberg – engineer, producer
Ron Berinstein – executive producer
Sherry Rayn Barnett – photography
Miriam Cutler & Swing Street – producer

References

1987 live albums
Shirley Horn live albums
Verve Records live albums